The A. B. C. Dodd House (also known as the Thomsen House) is a historic house located at 310 3rd Avenue in Charles City, Iowa.

Description and history 
It is a wood-framed, two-story, Prairie School-style house with attic and basement, built in 1910 and designed by architects Purcell and Elmslie, of the Purcell, Feick & Elmslie firm. It has an open plan around a fireplace core. Its 1977 nomination describes it as "deceptively simple in appearance," and, "architecturally, very important as a handsome and inexpensive Prairie School dwelling. Its meticulous maintenance and preservation of the original materials and colors reinforce its significance.

It was listed on the National Register of Historic Places on May 22, 1978.

References

Houses in Floyd County, Iowa
Charles City, Iowa
Houses completed in 1910
Houses on the National Register of Historic Places in Iowa
Prairie School architecture in Iowa
National Register of Historic Places in Floyd County, Iowa
1910 establishments in Iowa